Idja is the debut studio album by Finnish folk metal band Shaman, who later changed their name to Korpiklaani. The album was produced by Roope Latvala, best known as the guitarist of the Finnish metal bands Children of Bodom and Sinergy.

The song "Ođđa máilbmi" was also released as a demo/single before the album's release.

Track listing
All songs written by Jonne Järvelä, except where noted.

 "Ođđa máilbmi" (lyrics Maaren Aikio/Järvelä by music by Järvelä) – 4:15
 "Idja" – 3:24
 "Ulda" – 4:23
 "Vuojan" – 4:33
 "Riehču" – 4:07
 "Giella" – 2:41
 "Festet" – 2:27
 "Orbina" – 3:59
 "It šat duolmma mu" – 3:26
 "Ostir böö" – 3:46
 "Hunka lunka" – 2:05
 "Suollemaš bahčči" – 3:03

Personnel
 Jonne Järvelä - vocals, yoik, guitar, lead acoustic guitar, shaman drum, percussion
 Juke Eräkangas - drums, keyboards, backing vocals
 Ilkka Kilpeläinen - bass-guitar
 Tero Piirainen - guitars, keyboards, co-lead & backing vocals

Korpiklaani albums
1999 albums